Mitostemma is a genus of flowering plants belonging to the family Passifloraceae.

Its native range is Guyana to Brazil.

Species
Species:

Mitostemma brevifilis 
Mitostemma glaziovii 
Mitostemma jenmanii

References

Passifloraceae
Malpighiales genera